Martine is a 1961 Australian television play directed by Christopher Muir in Melbourne.

It was based on a play by Jean-Jacques Bernard.

Plot
In France, a young peasant girl Martine is secretly in love with Julien, a sophisticated man, even though he has a wife Joanne, who Madame Mervan arranged for him to marry. Alfred courts Martine but she rejects him.

Cast
Annette Andre as Martine
Frederick Parslow as Julien 
Joan Harris as Jeanne
Barbara Brandon as Madame Mervan, Julien's grandmother
Lloyd Cunnington as Station master
Graham Hughes as Alfred, a peasant

Production
The play was long in the repertoire of the Comedie Francaise and director Chris Muir said it required tender and delicate handling. Annette Andre said she enjoyed working with Muir "he was very intelligent and more experienced. He wasn’t easy, but he could get a performance out of an actor."

Reception
The Sydney Morning Herald said Parslow's "fine acting gave" the production "a touch of excellence that it otherwise could not hope to attain" calling the story "poignant, tender and slight."

References

External links

Australian television plays
1961 television plays